Cecilia Hincapié (born 20 November 1976) is a Colombian former professional tennis player.

Hincapié, who comes from Manizales, competed on the international tour in the early 1990s. She reached a best singles ranking of 405 in the world and won one ITF title. From 1993 to 1995 she represented the Colombia Fed Cup team, which included World Group appearances in the first two years.

Her career continued in the United States in the late 1990s, where she played college tennis for Auburn University at Montgomery. She earned NAIA All-American selection in each of her three seasons, between 1996 and 1998, before moving to Clemson University as a senior in 1999.

ITF finals

Singles: 4 (1–3)

Doubles: 3 (0–3)

See also
List of Colombia Fed Cup team representatives

References

External links
 
 
 

1976 births
Living people
Colombian female tennis players
Clemson Tigers women's tennis players
Auburn Montgomery Warhawks women's tennis players
People from Manizales
20th-century Colombian women
21st-century Colombian women